Saint Louis Hospital is a large private Catholic hospital in Sathon District, Bangkok, Thailand. Named for Saint Louis; the King of France, the hospital was founded in 1898 following the next-by Saint Louis Church, making it the first Catholic hospital in Thailand. The hospital's motto is "Ubi Caritas, Ibi Deus Est." (God resides in mercy.)

Saint Louis Hospital has been the prominent healthcare facility of Catholics in Thailand. The hospital has been visited by two Popes during both of the country's only papal visits; in 1984 by Pope John Paul II, and in 2019 by Pope Francis

Services 
Asides from the professional medical services certified with ISO9002 and ISO14001; Thailand's first healthcare facility to ever reached either of the standard, the hospital also provides some services to sustain the motto and the main aim towards mercy.

Divine Mercy Centre 
The Divine Mercy Centre is the palliative care centre of the hospital for the patients with less than 6 months expectancy. Some of the services include the Death Talk, conducting mass, or other religious ceremonies up to the patient's wills.

John Paul II Charity Clinic 
John Paul II Charity Clinic is the hospital's charity clinic which provides basic healthcare free-of-charge for patients in poverty, poor church-goers, and the hospital's staff members. The clinic was founded in order to commemorate the Papal visit to the hospital of Pope John Paul II in 1984.

Holy Spirit Chapel 

The Holy Spirit Chapel (is the chapel of the hospital. Founded in 1982, the chapel is now occupied by Deutschsprachige Kath: Gemeinde St. Marien in Bangkok, Thailand. It is the only place in Thailand to carry mass in German.

References 

Hospitals in Bangkok
Private hospitals in Thailand
Sathon district
Catholic Church in Thailand
Hospitals established in 1895
1895 establishments in Siam